The Gables Inn was a historic inn in Stowe, Vermont, United States. Located on the Mountain Road, Vermont Route 108, it was built in 1840 and was converted into an inn in 1938. It was demolished in 2020, having closed two years earlier.

The main inn consisted of twelve bedrooms, while two annex buildings (the Carriage House and the Riverview Suites) contained four and two rooms, respectively. (In 1994, the New York Times stated the inn had nineteen rooms, not eighteen.)

The last proprietors of the inn were New York natives Randy Stern and Annette Monachelli, who purchased it in September 1999 from Sol, Lynn and Josh Baumrind. Shortly afterward, Stern posted an advert in the Stowe Reporter saying: "The leaves will change; The Gables will not." Stern became the chef for the inn's restaurant, which had been noted for its breakfasts, and Monachelli was the inn's hostess.
Monachelli, a former attorney, died on February 5, 2013, of complications following a cerebral aneurysm she had around a week earlier. She was 47.

In 2019, Stern sold the inn to Eric and Robin Gershman and moved to Waterbury, Vermont. After consulting with an engineer, the Gershmans decided that the building's substandard condition meant it was more prudent to raze the structure rather than renovate it. As of 2022, the site of the inn remains vacant. The Carriage House, which was built by the Baumrinds adjacent to the inn to the northeast, is still in use, as are the Riverview Suites a short distance to the southwest, on Meadow Lane.

References

External links 

 

Buildings and structures in Stowe, Vermont
1840 establishments in Vermont
Hotels in Vermont
Hotels established in 1938
Buildings and structures demolished in 2020
Demolished hotels in the United States
Defunct hotels in the United States